Kilmarnock and Loudoun is a county constituency of the House of Commons of the Parliament of the United Kingdom. It elects one Member of Parliament (MP), using the first-past-the-post voting system.

Boundaries

The constituency consists of the northern half of East Ayrshire and contains the town of Kilmarnock and the Irvine Valley.

In 2005, the constituency was expanded to include part of the disbanded Carrick, Cumnock and Doon Valley constituency.

There was a Kilmarnock and Loudoun local government district covering a similar area, from 1975 to 1996. At the 1983 general election, this district was coterminous with the constituency boundaries

It does not share the same borders as the Scottish Parliament constituency of the same name.

The main towns are:
Newmilns and Greenholm
Catrine *
Auchinleck *
Darvel
Galston
Hurlford
Kilmarnock
Kilmaurs
Logan *
Lugar *
Mauchline *
Muirkirk *
Ochiltree*
Sorn *
Stewarton
Dunlop

Those towns marked * were not part of the original Kilmarnock and Loudoun, but were absorbed from the disbanded Carrick, Cumnock and Doon Valley.

Members of Parliament

Election results

Elections in the 2010s

Elections in the 2000s

Elections in the 1990s

Elections in the 1980s

See also 
 List of UK Parliamentary constituencies in Scotland
 Kilmarnock and Loudoun district

References

External links 
Constituency website

 

Westminster Parliamentary constituencies in Scotland
Constituencies of the Parliament of the United Kingdom established in 1983
Politics of Kilmarnock
Auchinleck
Galston, East Ayrshire